The 1935 Bowling Green Falcons football team, sometimes known as the "Bee Gees", was an American football team that represented Bowling Green State College (later renamed Bowling Green State University) in the Ohio Athletic Conference (OAC) during the 1935 college football season. In their first season under head coach Harry Ockerman, the Falcons compiled a 1–6 record (0–6 against OAC opponents), finished in last place out of 20 teams in the OAC, was shut out in its first six games, and was outscored in all games by a total of 246 to 25. Jim Greetham was the team captain.

Schedule

References

Bowling Green
Bowling Green Falcons football seasons
Bowling Green Falcons football